The Croatian Handball Cup is a national team handball competition in Croatia operated by the Croatian Handball Federation. It has been held annually since Croatian independence in 1991 and succeeded the former Yugoslavian Handball Cup.

Winners by season (men)

1991/92 Zagreb Lotto
1992/93 Badel 1862 Zagreb
1993/94 Badel 1862 Zagreb
1994/95 Badel 1862 Zagreb
1995/96 Banka Croatia Zagreb
1996/97 Badel 1862 Zagreb
1997/98 Badel 1862 Zagreb
1998/99 Badel 1862 Zagreb
1999/00 Badel 1862 Zagreb
2000/01 Metković Jambo
2001/02 Metković Jambo
2002/03 Zagreb
2003/04 Zagreb
2004/05 Zagreb
2005/06 Zagreb
2006/07 Croatia Osiguranje Zagreb
2007/08 CO Zagreb
2008/09 CO Zagreb
2009/10 CO Zagreb
2010/11 CO Zagreb
2011/12 CO Zagreb
2012/13 CO Zagreb
2013/14 CO Zagreb
2014/15 PPD Zagreb
2015/16 PPD Zagreb 
2016/17 PPD Zagreb
2017/18 PPD Zagreb 
2018/19 PPD Zagreb 
2019/20 Voided due to the coronavirus pandemic
2020/21 PPD Zagreb

Winners by season (women)

1991/92 Lokomotiva Zagreb
1992/93 Podravka
1993/94 Podravka
1994/95 Podravka
1995/96 Podravka Vegeta
1996/97 Podravka Dolcela
1997/98 Podravka Dolcela
1998/99 Podravka Dolcela
1999/00 Podravka Dolcela
2000/01 Podravka Vegeta
2001/02 Podravka Vegeta
2002/03 Podravka Vegeta
2003/04 Podravka Vegeta
2004/05 Lokomotiva Zagreb
2005/06 Podravka Vegeta
2006/07 Lokomotiva Zagreb
2007/08 Podravka Vegeta
2008/09 Podravka Vegeta
2009/10 Podravka Vegeta
2010/11 Podravka Vegeta
2011/12 Podravka Vegeta
2012/13 Podravka Vegeta
2013/14 Lokomotiva Zagreb
2014/15 Podravka Vegeta
2015/16 Podravka Vegeta
2016/17 Podravka Vegeta
2017/18 Lokomotiva Zagreb
2018/19 Podravka Vegeta
2019/20 Voided due to the coronavirus pandemic
2020/21 Lokomotiva Zagreb

External links 
Croatian Handball Federation

Cup, Croatian Handball